Walnut Creek Township is one of the fourteen townships of Holmes County, Ohio, United States. As of the 2010 census the population was 3,821, up from 3,530 at the 2000 census.

Geography
Located in the eastern part of the county, it borders the following townships:
Paint Township - north
Wayne Township, Tuscarawas County - northeast
Sugar Creek Township, Tuscarawas County - southeast
Clark Township - south
Berlin Township - west
Salt Creek Township - northwest corner

No municipalities are located in Walnut Creek Township, although the unincorporated community of Walnut Creek lies at the center of the township.

Name and history
It is the only Walnut Creek Township statewide.

Government
The township is governed by a three-member board of trustees, who are elected in November of odd-numbered years to a four-year term beginning on the following January 1. Two are elected in the year after the presidential election and one is elected in the year before it. There is also an elected township fiscal officer, who serves a four-year term beginning on April 1 of the year after the election, which is held in November of the year before the presidential election. Vacancies in the fiscal officership or on the board of trustees are filled by the remaining trustees.

References

External links
County website

Townships in Holmes County, Ohio
Townships in Ohio